Beaver Township is the name of some places in the U.S. state of Pennsylvania:
Beaver Township, Clarion County, Pennsylvania
Beaver Township, Columbia County, Pennsylvania
Beaver Township, Crawford County, Pennsylvania
Beaver Township, Jefferson County, Pennsylvania
Beaver Township, Snyder County, Pennsylvania

See also
Little Beaver Township, Pennsylvania
North Beaver Township, Pennsylvania
South Beaver Township, Pennsylvania
 Beaver, Pennsylvania

Pennsylvania township disambiguation pages